Sterling is an English surname. One source attributes this surname to a contraction of Easterling, "a name given to Hanse merchants" and nothing more than a compass point-associated name.  A second source suggests that this was a nickname from a Middle English term for coin: sterling.

Notable people with the surname include:

Sterling (baseball) (fl. 1890), American baseball player
Aljamain Sterling (born 1989), American mixed martial arts fighter
Alton Sterling (1979–2016), African-American man fatally shot by police
Andrew B. Sterling (1874–1955), American lyricist
Anne Fausto-Sterling (born 1944), American sexologist
Antoinette Sterling (1850–1904), Anglo-American vocalist
Barry Sterling (1943–2014), American businessman and politician
Brett Sterling (born 1984), American ice hockey player
Bruce Sterling (born 1954), American author, speaker and futurist
Bruce Foster Sterling (1870–1945), American politician
Christopher H. Sterling (born 1943), American professor of media and public affairs
Claire Sterling (1919-1995), American author and journalist
Debbie Sterling, founder and CEO of American toy company Goldieblox
Donald Sterling (born 1934), American businessman, attorney and basketball team owner
Donnie Sterling, American bassist
Edward Sterling (1773–1847), British journalist
Edward Boker Sterling (1851-1925), philatelist of Trenton, New Jersey
Elizabeth Sterling Haynes (1897–1957), Canadian theatre activist, née Sterling
Ford Sterling (1883–1939), American actor
Fred E. Sterling (1869-1934), American politician
George Sterling (1869–1926), American poet 
Georgie Sterling, Australian actress
H. J. Sterling (1882–1959), Canadian ice hockey administrator 
Jan Sterling (1921–2004), American actress
Jeffrey Sterling, Baron Sterling of Plaistow (born 1934), British peer and former chairman of P&O
Jim Sterling (born 1984), English video game journalist and reviewer
John Sterling (author) (1806–1844), British author
John William Sterling (1844–1918), American philanthropist, corporate attorney, and benefactor to Yale University
John Sterling (sportscaster) (born 1938), American radio broadcaster
Leon Sterling, Australian computer scientist
Lester Sterling (born 1936), Jamaican musician
Linder Sterling (born 1954), British artist
Mindy Sterling (born 1953), American actress
Nici Sterling (born 1968), British porn star
Norm Sterling (born 1942), Canadian politician
Peter Sterling (born 1940), American neuroscientist
Peter Sterling (born 1960), Australian rugby league player
Raheem Sterling (born 1994), English footballer 
Robert Sterling (1917-2006), American actor
Ross S. Sterling (1875–1949), American politician
Thomas Sterling (1851–1930), American politician
Thomas Sterling (computing), American computer scientist
Tisha Sterling (born 1944), American actress, daughter of Robert Sterling and Ann Sothern
Wallace Sterling (1906–1985), Canadian-born American university president
William T. Sterling (1808–1903), American politician

Fictional Sterlings 

 Bruce Sterling (Love of Life), American television soap opera character (1959 to 1980)
 Jim Sterling, character on the American TV series Leverage
 Scott Sterling (fictional), soccer/volleyball player from a pair of online viral videos by Studio C.
 Roger Sterling from Mad Men.
Dana Sterling, fictional character from American TV series RoboTech

See also
Stirling (surname)
Starling (name)

References